Ma'ruf, an Islamic term. The word could be directed to following links -

People 
 Kazi Maruf, is a Bangladeshi film actor.
Maruf al Rusafi, an Iraqi poet.
Maruf Hossain Ibn Saeed, a Bangladeshi art director
Maruf Khaznadar, Kurdish writer.
Maruf the Cobbler, a character in One Thousand and One Nights or The Arabian Nights

Locations 

Maruf, Korgun, a village in Turkey.
Maruf District, a district in Afghanistan.

Others 

Maroof (horse) (1990–1999), a racehorse.